Caleb Kelly (born 1972 in Dunedin) is a curator, author and educator from New Zealand currently based in Sydney, Australia. His particular area of interest is sound and noise works by artists.

Directorships and curation

High Reflections was a monthly series of sound events started in 2009 and curated by Kelly and Alex White at Serial Space in Sydney, Australia. It ended in May 2011 with a mini festival at Red Rattler.

In April 2010 Kelly produced "caleb.k presents" for the ISSUE Project Room in New York.

Until 2006 Caleb was one of the three directors of Pelt gallery including Peter Blamey and William Noble. It was located in Chippendale, a semi-industrial inner city suburb of Sydney. The gallery specialised in exhibitions artwork for which sound was the primary medium or only media. During its period of operation it was the venue for most of the impermanent audio events (also curated by Kelly).

Between 2001 and 2006 Caleb Kelly curated impermanent.audio; an independent sound event primarily concerned with the performance of new musics, focused listening, the still contemplation of abstract audio and the act of listening itself. By the time it ended in 2006 Kelly had produced over 100 events and festivals.

laudible was an early net radio station. Based in Sydney, it was part of the global XChange Network and Open Radio Archive Network Group (ORANG), which included Radio International Stadt (Germany), r a d i o q u a l i a (New Zealand/Adelaide/Amsterdam), RIX-C (Latvia) and irrational org (UK). laudible featured the sound works of many Australian and New Zealand artists and regularly re-broadcast local terrestrial stations via RealAudio. It ran until its parent server at orang.orang.de was compromised and erased.

Kelly was a guest producer at What Is Music in 2001 and co-producer in 2002 and 2004.

Educator

Kelly is currently a researcher, lecturer and supervisor at the College of Fine arts, the University of New South Wales, Sydney. He previously held positions at the University of Sydney, the University of Western Sydney and at Unitec in Auckland, New Zealand.

Bibliography
Tangible/Intangible: The Sound of Sculpture, Govett-Brewster Art Gallery, 2020

Gallery Sound, Bloomsbury 2017 Sound, (Ed) Whitechapel Gallery & MIT Press 2011 Cracked Media: The Sound of Malfunction, MIT Press 2009

Footnotes

Living people
1972 births
Academic staff of Western Sydney University
Artists from Dunedin
Academic staff of the University of Sydney
New Zealand curators